Heartbreak Express in the twenty-fourth solo studio album by American entertainer Dolly Parton. It was released on March 29, 1982, by RCA Records. The album returned Parton to a more fully realized country sound (a process she had begun on the previous year's 9 to 5 and Odd Jobs), after her late 1970s pop recordings. The album's first single, "Single Women", a slow-tempo honkytonk ballad about a singles bar, was written by Saturday Night Live writer Michael O'Donoghue, and had previously appeared in an SNL skit in late 1980.  The single provided a top ten single for Parton.  The title cut also was a top ten hit for her. "Do I Ever Cross Your Mind" (a song Parton had written in the early 1970s but had never officially recorded) appeared as a double-A-sided single (along with Parton's rerecording of "I Will Always Love You" from the Best Little Whorehouse in Texas), and reached No. 1 on the country charts in August 1982.

"Hollywood Potters", Parton has explained to interviewers, came out of her experience filming the movie 9 to 5, as Parton watched many of the film's extras and bit players, who had worked very hard at acting through the years, but with very little success.

The song, "Do I Ever Cross Your Mind," was performed by finalist of seventh season of American Idol Ramiele Malubay in 2008. She sang the song during the Dolly Parton tribute week. A studio version of her cover was released on the iTunes Store as "Do I Ever Cross Your Mind (American Idol Studio Version) - Single" in 2008. Heartbreak Express was re-released in digital format in 2013.

Track listing

Personnel
Dolly Parton - vocals
Albert Lee, Fred Tackett, Jeff Baxter, Mike Severs, Steve Cropper - guitar
Abraham Laboriel, Leland Sklar, Nathan East - bass
Joe McGuffee - steel guitar
Buddy Spicher - fiddle
Gregg Perry - dulcimer, backing vocals
Red Young, Ron Oates - keyboards
Eddy Anderson - drums
Lenny Castro - congas
Terry McMillan - harmonica
Alex Brown, Anita Ball, Denise Maynelli, Gene Morford, Jim Salestrom, Richard Dennison, Roy Galloway, Stephanie Spruill, Willie Greene Jr. - backing vocals
Chuck Findley, Gary Grant, Gary Herbig, George Bohanon, Jim Horn, Slyde Hyde, Tom Saviano, Tom Scott - horns
Herb Ritts - Photography

Major releases

Chart performance
Album

Album (Year-End)

References

External links
Heartbreak Express at Dolly Parton On-Line

Dolly Parton albums
1982 albums
RCA Records albums